Dream Flight (Vol De Rêve)  is a 3-D computer-animated short fiction film completely produced by computer. The film was created in 1982 at the University of Montreal and was directed by Philippe Bergeron, Nadia Magnenat Thalmann and Daniel Thalmann.

Plot
It is the story of a creature living on another planet and dreaming that he flies across space like a bird and arrives on Earth. Typical scenes are set in Paris and New York. Others show natural scenes such as ocean, trees, and birds.

Production
The film was programmed using the MIRA graphical language, an extension of the Pascal programming language based on Abstract Graphical Data Types.

Awards
The film was shown at the SIGGRAPH '82 Art Show and the SIGGRAPH ’83 Electronic Theater and received several awards including:
 First Award, Computer Graphics, Online, 1982
 Golden Sheaf Award, Yorkton Short Film and Video Festival, Canada, 1983
 Special Award, Murcia Film-Festival, Spain, 1984
 Chris Award, 32nd Annual Columbus International Film Festival (Ohio, USA), 1984 
 Special Award, Facets Multimedia, Chicago, 1985
 Raster Technologies award 1986

References

External links
 Dream Flight
 

1982 films
1980s American animated films
1982 computer-animated films
American animated short films
1982 3D films
1982 short films
1980s animated short films
Alien visitations in films
Films about dreams
Animated films set in Paris
Animated films set in New York (state)